Male Nilluvavarege is a 2015 Indian Kannada film directed by Mohan Shankar and starring himself. The movie is based on L S Sudhindra's Kannada drama adaptation of the English play The Deadly Game.

Cast 
 Mohan Shankar as Mohan 
 Kavitha Bohra as Isha 
 H. G. Dattatreya as Peter 
 Sharath Lohitashwa as Rachaiah 
 Srinivas Prabhu as Ramaiah
Kari Subbu as Pandu 
M. N. Lakshmi Devi
Bhumika 
Soujanya

Reception 
A critic from The Times of India wrote that "It’s a one-man show by Mohan who plays his role to perfection. Dattatreya, Sharath Lohithahwa, Kari Subbu and Srinivasa Prabhu have done their bit". A critic from The Hindu opined that "The audience needs to have lot of patience to watch Male Nilluvavarege , with a tag line Beware of Rain, as it is dialogue driven thriller drama woven around an incident that takes place in one night".

References 

2015 films
2010s Kannada-language films
Films based on Swiss novels
Films based on works by Friedrich Dürrenmatt